Ramada Asia-Pacific is the regional arm of the Ramada International hotel chain operated by the Wyndham Hotel Group. The Wyndham Hotel Group franchises hotels and provides property management services around the globe.

The Ramada Asia-Pacific network began with one hotel in Guangzhou, China, in 1991, the Ramada Pearl Guangzhou. Since then, it has grown to include 79 Hotels located across 12 countries in the region. Several new properties are planned for the Asia-Pacific region within the next few years.

Properties in Asia-Pacific
Ramada hotels in Asia Pacific are individually owned and are positioned to appeal to mid-market leisure and business travelers.  They are full-service hotels with onsite food and beverage outlets, business facilities, and fitness facilities.

Ramada Asia-Pacific properties in the region include:

Australia
 Ramada Encore Melbourne, Dandenong
 Ramada Hotel and Suites Ballina
 Ramada Hervey Bay
China
 Ramada Parkside Beijing
 Ramada Plaza Changchun
 Ramada Parkview Changzhou
 Ramada Plaza Chongqing West
 Ramada Plaza Dalian
 Ramada Dongguan
 Ramada Fuzhou
 Ramada Pearl Guangzhou
 Ramada Plaza Guangzhou
 Ramada Plaza Guiyang
 Ramada Hotel Hangzhou
 Ramada Plaza Hangzhou
 Ramada Huangshan Hotel
 Ramada Kunshan
 Ramada Meizhou
 Ramada Plaza Nanjing
 Ramada Shanghai Caohejing
 Ramada Plaza Gateway Shanghai
 Ramada Plaza Peace Shanghai Luwan
 Ramada Plaza Shanghai, Pudong
 Ramada Pudong Airport
 Ramada Plaza Sino-Bay Shanghai
 Ramada Hotel Shanghai Wujiaochang
 Ramada Shanghai Zhabei
 Ramada Plaza Pudong South Shanghai
 Ramada Pudong Shanghai Expo
 Ramada Shunde
 Ramada Plaza Taian
 Ramada Ürümqi
 Ramada Plaza Optics Valley Wuhan
 Ramada Plaza Tianlu Wuhan
 Ramada Wuxi
 Ramada Encore Wuxi
 Ramada Plaza Wuxi
 Ramada Xiamen
 Ramada Plaza Yantai
 Ramada Plaza Yiwu
 Ramada Plaza Zhengzhou
 Ramada Zibo
Guam
 Ramada Hotel & Suites Tamuning
Hong Kong
 Ramada Kowloon
 Ramada Hong Kong
India
 Ramada Plaza Agra
 Ramada Plaza Aligarh
 Ramada Chennai Egmore
 Ramada Plaza Chennai Guindy
 Ramada Caravela Beach Resort Goa
 Ramada Plaza Palm Grove
 Ramada Plaza JHV Varanasi
 Ramada Khajuraho
 Ramada Powai
 Ramada Resort Cochin
 Ramada Jaipur
 Ramada Jammu
 Ramada Jamshedpur
 Ramada Gurgaon BMK
 Ramada Gurgaon Central
 Ramada Bangalore
 Ramada Ahmedabad
 Ramada Encore Bangalore Domlur
 Ramada Alleppey Kerala
 Ramada Amritsar
 Ramada Navi Mumbai
 Ramada Udaipur Resort and Spa
Indonesia
 Ramada Resort Bintang Bali
 Ramada Resort Benoa Bali
 Ramada Resort Camakila, Legian, Bali
Japan
 Ramada Osaka
 Ramada Sapporo
Korea
 Ramada Plaza Gwangju
 Ramada Dongtan
 Ramada Plaza Suwon
 Ramada Hotel & Suites Seoul Central
 Ramada Seoul
 Ramada Songdo
 Ramada Plaza Jeju
 Ramada Encore Pohang
 Ramada Plaza Cheongju
Malaysia
Ramada Plaza Melaka
New Caledonia
 Ramada Plaza Nouméa
Pakistan
 Ramada Multan
 Ramada Plaza Karachi International Airport
 Ramada Islamabad
Sri Lanka
 Ramada Resort Kalutara
 Ramada Katunayaka - Colombo International Airport
 Ramada Colombo
Thailand
 Ramada Resort Khao Lak
 Ramada D'MA Bangkok
 Ramada Plaza Menam Riverside Bangkok
 Ramada Hotel & Suites Bangkok

Planned future developments

Singapore

The Wyndham Hotel Group recently announced plans to enter the Singapore hotel and lodging market with a new property expected to open in 2014, the 391-room Ramada Singapore, to be located in the Balestier Park area.

The 17-story Ramada Singapore at Zhongshan Park will include a full-service restaurant, fitness center, swimming pool, business center and more than 600 square-meters of meeting space.

This will be the first Ramada International property in Singapore.

China

In February 2010, the Wyndham Hotel Group announced its expansion in China with the development of an additional four hotels in China, bringing the total number of Ramada properties there to 39.

These four properties are the Ramada Sanya hotel, the Ramada Plaza Wenzhou, the Ramada Longyan hotel, and the Ramada Xi'an Bell Tower hotel. All four are currently under development and will be full-service hotels featuring business and conference facilities, onsite food and beverage outlets, as well as fitness facilities.

India

The group also plans to expand its presence in India with four additional properties in the country, for a total of 14 properties in India.

These are the 140-room Ramada Amritsar hotel, the 130-room Ramada Gurgaon Expressway New Delhi hotel, the 392-room Ramada Plaza Dwarka New Delhi hotel, and the 100-room Ramada Gurgaon Central hotel.

Thailand

The group signed its first management agreements in Bangkok, Thailand at the end of 2009. New properties now under development include the 188-room Ramada Encore Soi 10 – Bangkok, the 98-room Ramada Hotel & Suites Soi 12 – Bangkok, and the 150-room Ramada Bangkok Sukhumvit. The new properties bring the number of Ramada hotels in Thailand to six in total.

The Ramada Hotel & Suites Bangkok prime location is within close proximity of the Sukhumvit commercial and entertainment district where first-rate shopping, dining, and nightlife options. Ramada Hotels and Suites Bangkok

References

External links
 http://www.ramadahotels.cn/enzs/Ramada/control/home?variant=cn
 http://www.ramada.com/Ramada/control/index?variant=int
 https://web.archive.org/web/20130224044246/http://www.ramadasuitesbangkok.com/things-to-do/klongtoey-attractions.aspx

Ramada
Hotels established in 1991
Hotel chains in India
1991 establishments in China